= John Brown's War Against Slavery =

2009 book by Robert E. McGlone

- Author: Robert E. McGlone
- Subject: Biography
- Publisher: Cambridge University Press
- Publication date: 2009
- Pages: 451
- ISBN: 9780521514439

John Brown's War Against Slavery is a 2009 book by American historian Robert E. McGlone. A biography of abolitionist John Brown, McGlone challenges previous biographies on Brown, submitting social experiences in Kansas as driving Brown's actions rather than lack of sanity or his religious views.

== Commentary and reviews ==
- Daly, John Patrick (2010). "Review of John Brown's War against Slavery". The American Historical Review. 115 (3): 844. ISSN 0002-8762.
- Decaro, Louis A. (2011). "Review of John Brown's War against Slavery". Journal of American Studies. 45 (2): 383–384. ISSN 0021-8758.
- Edelstein, Tilden G. (2010). "Review of John Browns War against Slavery". The Journal of American History. 97 (1): 179–180. ISSN 0021-8723.
- Epps, Kristen (2013). "John Brown's War Against Slavery". American Studies. 52 (3): 71–72.
- Etcheson, Nicole (June 2011). "John Brown's War against Slavery (review)". Civil War History. 57 (2): 182–184. doi:10.1353/cwh.2011.0019.
- Gilpin, R. Blakeslee (June 2011). "John Brown's War Against Slavery". Slavery & Abolition. 32 (2): 315–316. doi:10.1080/0144039X.2011.568244.
- Harris, J. William (2010). "Review of John Brown's War against Slavery". The Journal of Interdisciplinary History. 41 (2): 313–314. ISSN 0022-1953.
- Herrington, Philip Mills (Fall 2009). "John Brown's War against Slavery, by Robert E. McGlone". The Virginia Quarterly Review. 85 (4): 212.
- Laughlin-Schultz, Bonnie (2011). "Weighing John Brown". Reviews in American History. 39 (4): 642–646. ISSN 0048-7511.
- McDaniel, W Caleb (May 2011). "Review of John Brown's War Against Slavery". The Journal of Southern History. 77 (2): 436–437.
- Reynolds, David S. (2010). "Review of John Brown's War against Slavery". The New England Quarterly. 83 (1): 148–150. ISSN 0028-4866.
